Laura Cameron (born 27 January 1984) is a British professional racing cyclist who rides for Drops Cycling Team.

See also
 List of 2016 UCI Women's Teams and riders

References

External links
 

1984 births
Living people
British female cyclists
Place of birth missing (living people)
21st-century British women